The brown-capped pygmy woodpecker or Indian pygmy woodpecker (Yungipicus nanus) is a species of very small  woodpecker found in Nepal, India and Sri Lanka. Some taxonomic authorities continue to place this species in the genus Dendrocopos or Picoides.

Description
A small brown and white woodpecker with distinctive pink-rimmed white irises. Barred brown and white above, lightly streaked dirty white below. Tail spotted white. Paler brown crown (edged red in male) and eyestripes contrasting with white supercilia and cheeks.

Gallery

References

brown-capped pygmy woodpecker
Birds of South Asia
brown-capped pygmy woodpecker
Taxobox binomials not recognized by IUCN